Vandolph Lacsamana Quizon (born; May 7, 1984) is a Filipino actor, comedian and politician. He also serves as a councilor of Parañaque from the 1st district since 2016.

Personal life 
He is the only son of comedian Dolphy with actress-politician Alma Moreno.

Television and film career

1980s showbiz debut
Vandolph's very first movie was Balimbing: Taong Huyango in 1986 with his real life father the late comedy king Dolphy.

1990s
Vandolph appeared in Ang TV on ABS-CBN in 1992, then followed by a sitcom Home Along Da Riles also on ABS-CBN. In the same year, he also did a drama anthology with his father Dolphy on Maalaala Mo Kaya. In 1993, he also appeared on GMA Telecine Specials on GMA which he plays a hyper kid who went to America. The same year, he launched a new sitcom Tondominium, directed by Joey Marquez, Vandolph's former stepfather.

2000–2005
In 2000, Vandolph's first action series was Pintados on GMA with his co-stars Michael Flores, Assunta Del Rossi, Angelika Dela Cruz and Sherwin Ordonez. In 2001, he was involved in a car accident. He survived with Amnesia but his girlfriend "Ishi" died due to head injuries. In 2005, he guested in a youth oriented drama series, Maynila also on GMA, and guested a reality shows Victim Extreme on ABS-CBN and Extra Challenge on GMA. The same year, Vandolph met Jenny Salimao and they become longtime love partners.

2006–2010
In 2006, he launched his first gag show, Quizon Avenue on ABS-CBN. In 2008, his biggest break was the action series Palos. The same year, he returns to sitcom via John En Shirley a spin-off of John En Marsha. In 2009, Vandolph signed a contract with TV5, joining a family fantasy sitcom, Pidol's Wonderland and was a celebrity guest judge on Talentadong Pinoy also in the same year. In 2010, he returns to drama anthology, Untold Stories Mula Sa Face To Face on TV5.

2011–present
In 2011, Vandolph returns to drama again and his biggest break was Babaeng Hampaslupa, a Chinese-themed drama and very first primetime drama series on TV5. Vandolph returned to big screen via Praybeyt Benjamin released by Star Cinema and Viva Films, which was also Vandolph's 1st movie for Viva Films and first Star Cinema film since Home Along Da Riles 2.

In 2012, Vandolph returns to comedy again and also his first Fantaserye for kids entitled Wako Wako marking Vandolph's return to ABS-CBN after his last teleserye was Palos.

In 2013, Vandolph returns to VIVA Films via a comedy action movie The Fighting Chefs, which was Vandolph's 2nd VIVA movie. He also guested in a game show Minute to Win It.

In 2014, Vandolph's recent movie ABNKKBSNPLAko. Recently, he is also part and returns to drama again via The Legal Wife, the role said which he plays the best friend of Angel Locsin's character.

Politics
In the 2016, he ran for councilor of 1st District of Parañaque and won. He was re-elected in 2019 and in 2022.

Filmography

Television
Ang TV (ABS-CBN, 1992)
Lovingly Yours (GMA Network, 1992)
Home Along Da Riles (ABS-CBN, 1992–1998) - Baldomero "Baldo" Kosme
Maalaala Mo Kaya (ABS-CBN, 1993)
GMA Telecine Specials (GMA Network, 1993)
Tondominium (TV5, 1993)
Purungtong (9TV, 1993)
Batibot (RPN 9, 1994)
Wow Mali! (TV5, 1996)
Pintados (GMA Network, 2000)
Magpakailanman (GMA Network, 2002)
Home Along Da Airport (ABS-CBN, 2003–2005) - Baldomero "Baldo" Kosme
Victim Extreme (ABS-CBN, 2005)
Maynila (GMA Network, 2005)
Extra Challenge (GMA Network, 2005) - Challenger
Quizon Avenue (ABS-CBN, 2006)
O-Ha! (TV5, 2006)
John En Shirley (ABS-CBN, 2006-2007)
Sabi Ni Nanay (RPN, 2007)
Palos (ABS-CBN, 2008) 
Eat Bulaga (GMA Network, 2008) - joined and won as EB Bebot
Talentadong Pinoy (TV5, 2009)
Pidol's Wonderland (TV5, 2009)
Untold Stories Mula Sa Face To Face (TV5, 2010)
Spooky Nights Presents (GMA Network, 2010)
Babaeng Hampaslupa (TV5, 2011)
Wako Wako (ABS-CBN, 2012)
Wiltime Bigtime (TV5, 2012) - Guest Host
Wansapanataym (ABS-CBN, 2012)
It's Showtime (ABS-CBN, 2012) - Celebrity Judge
Toda Max (ABS-CBN, 2012) - Guest
Be Careful With My Heart (ABS-CBN, 2012–2014)
Minute To Win It (ABS-CBN, 2013) - Guest
The Legal Wife (ABS-CBN, 2014)
Two Wives (ABS-CBN, 2014)
Wasak (TV5, 2015)
Kapamilya Deal Or No Deal (ABS-CBN, 2015)
Tunay Na Buhay (GMA Network, 2015)
Sabado Badoo (GMA Network, 2015) - cameo footage
Ningning (ABS-CBN 2, 2015)
Wowowin (GMA Network, 2015)
Dangwa (GMA Network, 2015) 
Karelasyon (GMA Network, 2016)
Dear Uge (GMA Network, 2016)

Film
Balimbing: Mga Taong Hunyango (1986)
Wanted: Bata Batuta (1987)
Bata Batuta (1987)
Enteng the Dragon (1988)
Bulag Pipi At Bingi (1991)
Pempe ni Sara at Pen (1992)
Espadang Patpat (1992)
Home Along Da Riles The Movie (1993) - Baldomero "Baldo" Kosme
Walang Matigas Na Tinapay Sa Mainit Na Kape (1994)
Hataw Tatay Hataw (1994) - Boyet
Boy Gising (1995) - Boy Gising
Father & Son (1995) Bimbo
Aringkingking (1996)
Pakners (1997)
Home Along Da Riles The Movie 2 (1997) - Baldomero "Baldo" Kosme
Tatay-Nic (1998)
Home Along Da Riber (2002)
Nobody, Nobody But... Juan (2009)
Father Jejemon (2010)
Praybeyt Benjamin (2011) - Vandolph's 1st Viva Films movie
The Fighting Chefs (2013)
ABNKKBSNPLAko?! The Movie (2014) - post-production
The Amazing Praybeyt Benjamin (2014) - post-production
Beauty and the Bestie (2015) - post-production
On The Job 2: The Missing 8 (2021) - pre production & Vandolph's 1st action drama thriller movie

Awards and nominations

Notes

References

External links
 

Living people
Filipino actor-politicians
Filipino male comedians
Filipino television personalities
Filipino male film actors
People from Parañaque
PDP–Laban politicians
Liberal Party (Philippines) politicians
Quizon family
Metro Manila city and municipal councilors
1984 births